Phosphoric monoester hydrolases (or phosphomonoesterases) are enzymes that catalyse the hydrolysis of O-P bonds by nucleophilic attack of phosphorus by cysteine residues or coordinated metal ions.

They are categorized with the EC number 3.1.3.

Examples include: 
 acid phosphatase
 alkaline phosphatase
 fructose-bisphosphatase
 glucose-6-phosphatase
 phosphofructokinase-2
 phosphoprotein phosphatase
 calcineurin
 6-phytase

See also
 phosphodiesterase
 phosphatase

External links
 

Metabolism